Suresh Kumar Rayala is an Indian cancer biologist and a professor at the department of biotechnology of the Indian Institute of Technology Madras. Known for his molecular and mechanistic studies of oncogenes and tumor suppressor genes, Rayala is a recipient of the Young Scientist Award of the Academy of Sciences, Chennai. The Department of Biotechnology of the Government of India awarded him the National Bioscience Award for Career Development, one of the highest Indian science awards, for his contributions to biosciences, in 2017–18.

Selected bibliography

See also 

 PAK1
 Hepatocyte nuclear factor 4 alpha

Notes

References

External links 
 
 
 

Fellow of National Academy of Sciences - 2019, FNASc

N-BIOS Prize recipients
Indian scientific authors
Living people
Scientists from Tamil Nadu
Indian biologists
Academic staff of IIT Madras
Year of birth missing (living people)